FETP may refer to:
Field Epidemiology Training Program
Fulbright Economics Teaching Program